Rob Thomas (born 9 October 1990) is an English professional rugby league footballer who has played in the 2010s.

Background
Rob Thomas was born in Ashford, Kent, England.

Playing career 
Rob Thomas played for the West London Sharks before signing for the London Broncos academy at 13 years old.

Club career
Rob Thomas made his début for Harlequins RL (now London Broncos) as an Interchange/substitute in the 22-24 defeat by Bradford Bulls in the Super League XVI match at Odsal Stadium, Bradford on Sunday 3 April 2011.

References

External links
Search for "Rob Thomas" at bbc.co.uk

1990 births
Living people
English rugby league players
Hemel Stags players
London Broncos players
London Skolars players
People from Ashford, Kent
Rugby league players from Kent
Rugby league props